The 2016–17 Penn Quakers women's basketball team represented the University of Pennsylvania during the 2016–17 NCAA Division I women's basketball season. The Quakers, led by eighth year head coach Mike McLaughlin, play their home games at the Palestra and are members of the Ivy League. The team was picked by the Ivy League in the pre-season to be conference champions. They finished the season 22–8, 13–1 to win the Ivy League regular season title and their first ever Ivy League Tournament to earn an automatic trip to the NCAA women's tournament, which they had a 21 point lead before losing to Texas A&M in the first round.

Ivy League changes
This season, the Ivy League instituted conference postseason tournaments. The tournaments only awarded the Ivy League automatic bids for the NCAA Division I Men's and Women's Basketball Tournaments; the official conference championships will continue to be awarded based solely on regular-season results. The Ivy League playoff took place March 11 and 12 at the Palestra. There were two semi-final games on the first day with the No. 1 seed playing the No. 4 seed and the No. 2 seed playing the No. 3 seed. The final was played the next day for the NCAA bid.

Roster

Schedule

|-
!colspan=8 style="background:#95001A; color:#FFFFFF;"| Regular season

|-
!colspan=9 style="background:#95001A; color:#01256E;"| Ivy League Women's tournament

|-
!colspan=9 style="background:#95001A;"| NCAA women's tournament

Rankings
2016–17 NCAA Division I women's basketball rankings

See also
 2016–17 Penn Quakers men's basketball team

References

Penn
Penn Quakers women's basketball seasons
Penn
Penn
Penn